KWDR (93.5 FM) is a radio station broadcasting a country music format since June 2019.. Prior to that, it was a smooth jazz station. It focuses on country music from the 1990s to early 2000s. It made the format switch on May 31, 2019. The format is Westwood One "Nash Icon" country.

The station is owned by Jacobs Radio Programming, LLC.

Translators
KWDR broadcasts on the following translators:
K272ED 102.3 MHz in Kennewick, Washington
K298BR 107.5 MHz in Wenatchee, Washington

References

External links
 

WDR
Country radio stations in the United States
Radio stations established in 2008
2008 establishments in Washington (state)